Police Academy is a series of American comedy films, the first six of which were made in the 1980s and the seventh in 1994. The series opened with Police Academy (1984), which started with the premise that a new mayor had announced a policy requiring the police department to accept all willing recruits. The film followed a group of misfit recruits in their attempts to prove themselves capable of being police officers, and succeeding both in spite of and because of their eccentricities. The main character in the first four films, Carey Mahoney (Steve Guttenberg), was a repeat offender, who was forced to join the police academy as punishment. The seventh and to date last installment, Mission to Moscow, was released in 1994. Guttenberg in September 2018 announced that a new Police Academy film was in the works.

In general, all of the films and television shows depended on simple slap-stick humour, usually based on simple characterizations and physical comedy. As with many similar films, the theme was a group of underdogs struggling to prove themselves, while various authority figures tried to suppress them. The sequels have not been well received by critics, although they were very successful commercially. The first film grossed $149.8 million worldwide and made a profit of $35 million. The sequels grossed $387 million in total.  Parallels have been drawn between Police Academy and the British Carry On series, for their common reliance on a largely constant ensemble cast throughout the various films, the two series' frequent use of low-brow humor, sexual innuendo, and physical comedy. George Gaynes, Michael Winslow, and David Graf were the only actors appearing in all seven films of the series.

Films

Police Academy (1984)

Police Academy was released in 1984 and directed by Hugh Wilson. The film has a newly elected female mayor announcing a policy requiring the police department to accept all willing recruits. The movie followed a group of misfit recruits in their attempts to prove themselves capable of being police officers and their adventures at the police academy.

Police Academy 2: Their First Assignment (1985)

In 1985's Police Academy 2: Their First Assignment, the newly graduated cadets are sent to one of the worst precincts in the city to improve the conditions. Lt. Mauser undermines their attempts so he can get Capt. Lassard fired and get the position in charge.

Police Academy 3: Back in Training (1986)

Police Academy 3: Back in Training was released in 1986, and like its predecessor, was directed by Jerry Paris. When the governor of the state announces that budget cuts are in order to get rid of the worst of the two police academies, the metropolitan police academy, led by Commandant Lassard, work on ensuring it is not theirs. This is hindered by their unusual gang of new cadets.

Police Academy 4: Citizens on Patrol (1987)

The fourth installment, Police Academy 4: Citizens on Patrol, released in 1987, involves new recruits being brought in when the officers work with a newly formed Citizens on Patrol group.  Harris and Proctor are in charge, though, and plan to dismantle the program. Citizens on Patrol was the final film starring Guttenberg.

Police Academy 5: Assignment Miami Beach (1988)

Police Academy 5: Assignment Miami Beach, released in 1988, was directed by Alan Myerson. The plot involves the officers attending a police convention in Florida to honor Commandant Eric Lassard as police officer of the decade, wherein he inadvertently switches his sports bag with that of a group of jewel thieves. The thieves try to get it back.

Police Academy 6: City Under Siege (1989)

The sixth installment, Police Academy 6: City Under Siege, directed by Peter Bonerz, was released in 1989. When the city suffers from a dangerous set of crimes by a gang of jewel thieves, the Metropolitan Police Academy graduates are brought in to do something about it.

Police Academy: Mission to Moscow (1994)

Police Academy: Mission to Moscow, released in 1994 and directed by Alan Metter, involved the officers going to Russia to help catch an international crime figure.

Future
An eighth installment or reboot has been in development hell since 2003.

As of September 2003, plans were set in motion for an eighth Police Academy film to be released in 2007 after more than 13 years of absence. Says series creator Paul Maslansky: "I felt it was time to start again. I saw that Starsky & Hutch and a number of other revivals were doing really well. Police Academy has such a great history, so I thought, 'Why not?'" Most of the main cast members were due to return, except David Graf (Sgt. Eugene Tackleberry), Marion Ramsey (Officer Laverne Hooks) and Billie Bird (Lois Feldman) who have died. Hugh Wilson was slated to direct.

Leslie Easterbrook (Capt. Debbie Callahan) and Marion Ramsey (Sgt. Laverne Hooks) mentioned that filming for the next Police Academy film was due to start shooting in summer 2006 for a release in 2007. The film was shelved in October 2006. Easterbrook did mention that there was still hope for a direct-to-DVD sequel. She added that while Warner Bros. wanted to do one, they wanted a producer to get independent financing.

In May 2008, Michael Winslow replied to a question about a possible new Police Academy film: "Anything's possible. You've got to hope for Paul Maslansky and those folks over there to put it together. It's up to them. It would be great to see everyone again."

In a radio interview on November 26, 2008, with Colin Paterson for BBC Five Live's Simon Mayo show, Steve Guttenberg (Sgt. Carey Mahoney) confirmed that 8 was still in development and that he was working on the script with Warner Bros. Guttenberg is slated to direct the film, and stated that all of the cast from the previous installments (except for the deceased David Graf, Billie Bird, and Tab Thacker) would return to reprise their roles.

After seven films in its original 10-year run, New Line is planning on reviving the Police Academy series, which grossed $537 million worldwide and spawned a pair of TV spinoffs. The slapstick comedy will be helmed by original producer Paul Maslansky. "It's going to be very worthwhile to the people who remember it and to those who saw it on TV", Maslansky told the Hollywood Reporter. "It's going to be a new class. We hope to discover new talent and season it with great comedians. It'll be anything but another movie with a numeral next to it. And we'll most probably retain the wonderful musical theme."

In an interview with MTV Movies Blogs on March 17, 2010, Paul Maslansky stated that he plans to bring back some of the original cast to train the new recruits. When asked which characters he would bring back, Maslansky stated, "I haven't decided which ones. And I don't want to mention names and others will be disappointed, at this point. All I know is that I want to bring back some of the older characters to it, and maybe they'll have principal roles, some of them, and some of them might be just you know [a cameo]."

While appearing as a guest on the July 12, 2010, edition of This Morning, Michael Winslow (Sgt. Larvell Jones) confirmed that Police Academy 8 is still in production. In August 2010, Steve Guttenberg revealed a script was being written by David Diamond and David Weissman.

On August 9, 2010, actor Bobcat Goldthwait (Officer Zed) released a statement urging Hollywood to reboot the Police Academy series with a new group of actors instead of the original cast members. Goldthwait confirmed that Steve Guttenberg would return and that movie bosses were trying to get Kim Cattrall and Sharon Stone to return for an eighth film, though Goldthwait said he had no desire to return to the series.

On January 9, 2012, New Line Cinema confirmed that Scott Zabielski (Tosh.0) will be the director of the upcoming film. During a radio interview on March 21, 2012, Michael Winslow stated that production of the eighth film was due to begin in November, and that an offer had been made to Shaquille O'Neal to replace the late Bubba Smith as Hightower.  On June 5, 2012, Jeremy Garelick (The Break-Up) was hired by New Line Cinema to help rewrite the aforementioned script.

On September 3, 2018, Steve Guttenberg announced that a new Police Academy film was in the works when he responded to a fan on Twitter saying "the next Police Academy is coming, no details yet, but it is in a gift bag being readied!"

Television

Police Academy (1988–1989)

An animated comedy entitled Police Academy, also known as Police Academy: The Animated Series, was produced by Ruby-Spears Productions and Warner Bros. Television. It ran from September 1988 to September 1989, lasting two seasons with 65 episodes produced.

Police Academy: The Series (1997–1998)

Police Academy: The Series was a 1997 live-action show based on the films, comprising 26 hour-long episodes. It was produced by Warner Bros. Television and Protocol Entertainment. Michael Winslow reprised his role from the films, the only cast member from the films to have a recurring role on the show, although several others made occasional guest appearances.

Comic books
A six-issue series of Police Academy comic books was produced as a spin-off of the animated series beginning in August 1989. The series was published by Marvel Comics, under a "Star Comics Presents" byline.

The series was written by Angelo DeCesare, pencilled by Howard Post, and inked by Jacqueline Roettcher.

Cast and crew

Principal cast

Additional crew

Reception

Box office performance

Critical and public response
The films have received overall negative reviews, apart from the first film which had more mixed reviews.

Music
 Soundtracks 
 Police Academy: Original Motion Picture Soundtrack
 Police Academy 2: Their First Assignment (Original Motion Picture Soundtrack)
 Police Academy 3: Back in Training (Original Motion Picture Soundtrack)
 Police Academy 4: Citizens on Patrol (Original Motion Picture Soundtrack)
 Police Academy 5: Assignment Miami Beach (Original Motion Picture Soundtrack)
 Police Academy 6: City Under Siege (Original Motion Picture Soundtrack)
 Police Academy: Mission to Moscow (Original Motion Picture Soundtrack)

Other media

Theme park attraction

References

External links
 
 
 
 
 
 
 

 
Warner Bros. films
Warner Bros. Pictures franchises
American film series
Comedy film franchises
Films adapted into television shows
Film series introduced in 1984
Films set in police academies
Mass media franchises introduced in 1984